Lone Walnut is a ghost town in Lincoln County, Kansas, United States.

History
Lone Walnut was issued a post office in 1878. The post office was discontinued in 1900.

References

Former populated places in Lincoln County, Kansas
Former populated places in Kansas